Nick Kaaijmolen (born 28 August 2000) is a Dutch footballer who plays as a midfielder for PAEEK.

Career

Kaaijmolen started his career with Dutch second tier side Telstar. In 2021, he signed for Prespa Birlik in the Swedish fourth tier. After that, Kaaijmolen signed for Cypriot fourth tier club APEA. Before the second half of 2021–22, he signed for PAEEK in the Cypriot top flight. On 14 March 2022, he debuted for PAEEK during a 0–4 loss to Ethnikos.

References

External links
 

2000 births
Association football midfielders
Cypriot First Division players
Division 2 (Swedish football) players
Dutch expatriate footballers
Dutch expatriate sportspeople in Cyprus
Dutch expatriate sportspeople in Sweden
Dutch footballers
Expatriate footballers in Cyprus
Expatriate footballers in Sweden
KSF Prespa Birlik players
Living people
PAEEK players
SC Telstar players